

On vehicles
Underseal (often called undercoating in the U.S.) is a thick resilient coating applied to the underbody or chassis of an automobile to protect against impact damage from small stones, which would rapidly chip ordinary paint, allowing rusting to begin.

Historically, a bitumen-based compound was used, but after approximately a decade, this becomes brittle and water can become trapped between the underseal and body metal, counterproductively creating a more favourable environment for rust than if no underseal was applied at all.  Wax-based underseals do not have this disadvantage, but can be eroded and eventually washed off by enthusiastic use of a hot pressure washer.  Rubber-based underseals are also sometimes used.

Vehicles for sale in some territories are not undersealed, because the climate is not sufficiently aggressive to warrant it.  If such a vehicle is subsequently imported into a country with high rainfall, cold winters, and where salting of the roads is common, application of underseal is strongly recommended to ensure the vehicle has a long life.

On roads
When concrete on streets, parking lots, or warehouse floors begins to degrade, there are a few methods of repair available. Concrete undersealing is a process by which hot asphalt is pumped underneath the concrete slab so it flows into patches that were hollow and eroded. After concrete undersealing, the concrete is more stable and can be overlaid with a thin layer of asphalt to repair cracks, saving the expense and time of replacing the entire surface.

Automotive technologies
Corrosion prevention